Bunyarit Prathomtas (Thai  บุญยฤทธิ์ ปฐมทัศน์) is a Thai footballer. He plays for Thai League 2 clubside Krabi.

External links
Profile at Thaipremierleague.co.th

1986 births
Living people
Bunyarit Prathomtas
Association football midfielders
Bunyarit Prathomtas